Arab-Berbers ( al-ʿarab wa-l-barbar) , a vast region of North Africa in the western part of the Arab world along the Mediterranean Sea and the Atlantic Ocean. , most of whom speak a variant of Maghrebi Arabic as their native language, some also speak various Berber languages. Many Arab-Berbers identify primarily as Arab and secondarily as Berber.

; in addition, Banu Hilal and Sulaym Arab tribes originating in the Arabian Peninsula invaded the region and intermarried with the local rural mainly Berber populations, and were a major factor in the linguistic, cultural and ethnic Arabization of the Maghreb.

Arab-Berbers form the core and vast majority of the populations of Algeria, Libya, Morocco, and Tunisia, and about one-third of the population of Mauritania.

Arab-Berbers primarily speak variants of Maghrebi Arabic which form a dialect continuum of more-or-less mutually intelligible varieties known as (Darija or Derja. which means "everyday/colloquial language". Maghrebi Arabic preserves a significant Berber, Latin and possibly Neo-Punic<ref name="maghribi">{{Cite journal |last=Elimam |first=Abdou |date=1998 |title=' 'Le maghribi, langue trois fois millénaire |url=http://insaniyat.revues.org/12102 |journal=Insaniyat / إنسانيات. Revue Algérienne d'Anthropologie et de Sciences Sociales |issue=6 |pages=129–130 |issn=1111-2050}}</ref> substratum which makes them both quite distinct and largely mutually unintelligible to other varieties of Arabic spoken outside Maghreb. Moreover, they also have many loanwords from French, Turkish, Italian and the languages of Spain. Modern Standard Arabic is used as the lingua franca.

Historical perspective

Since the populations were partially affiliated with the Arab Muslim culture, Northwest Africa also started to be referred to by the Arabic speakers as Al-Maġrib, the Maghreb (meaning "The West") as it was considered as the western part of the known world. For historical references, medieval Arab and Muslim historians and geographers used to refer to Morocco as Al-Maghrib al Aqşá ("The Farthest West"), disambiguating it from neighboring historical regions called Al-Maghrib al Awsat ("The Middle West", Algeria) and Al-Maghrib al Adna'' ("The Nearest West", Ifriqiya (Tunisia)).

The Maghreb was gradually arabized with the spread of Islam in the 7th century AD, when the liturgical language Arabic was first brought to the Maghreb. However, the bulk of the population of northwestern Africa remained Berber or Roman Africans at least until the 14th century. Arabization was at least partly strengthened in the rural areas in the 11th century with the emigration of the Banu Hilal tribes from Egypt. However, many parts of the Maghreb were only arabized relatively recently in the 19th and 20th centuries, such as the area of the Aurès (Awras) mountains. Lastly, the mass education and promotion of Arabic language and culture through schools and mass media, during the 20th century, by the maghrebis governments, is regarded as the strongest contributor to the Arabization process in the Maghreb.

See also

Maghrebis
Arabs
Arabized Berber
Banu Hilal
Banu Sulaym
Beni Hassan
North Africa
Maghreb
Kouloughlis
Berber Jews
Demographics of the Middle East and North Africa
Arab-Persians

References

 
Arabs in North Africa
Arab groups
Arabization
Maghreb
Ethnic groups in North Africa